Dębna  (Dubne) is a village in the administrative district of Gmina Sanok, within Sanok County, Subcarpathian Voivodeship, in south-eastern Poland.

References

Villages in Sanok County